Besnik Ilmi Hasi (born 29 December 1971) is an Albanian professional football coach and former player who was most recently the manager of Saudi club Al-Ahli.

Club career
Born in Gjakova, SFR Yugoslavia (present day Kosovo), he began playing with his hometown team KF Vëllaznimi at an early age before joining KF Liria playing back then in the Yugoslav Second League where he began playing as a senior. He played one game with FC Prishtina in the 1991–92 Yugoslav First League. He then played with NK Zagreb and FK Dinamo Pančevo (on loan) still in Yugoslavia. In 1992, he returned to NK Zagreb, now playing in a newly formed Croatian First League and he also played with NK Samobor before moving to Belgium.

Hasi moved to KRC Genk in mid-1994, then to TSV 1860 Munich where he played only seven times during the 1997–98 season. He returned to KRC Genk establishing himself in starting lineup, winning the Belgian Title in the 1998–99 season. During his time at Genk, his family were forced to flee Kosovo to Albanian during the Kosovo War.

Hasi moved to RSC Anderlecht in May 2000 and, despite only playing 16 matches in his first season due to injury problems, helped the club retain their league title. He played 30 games the following year, including five in the UEFA Champions League to add to his five of the previous season.

Groin and knee problems restricted Hasi to eleven league appearances and four UEFA Cup games in 2002–03, however, but he returned to fitness to help Anderlecht win back the Belgian crown the following season.

In the 2004–05 season, he suffered torn ligaments in his left knee and was out for three months, when he came back he was limited to just 14 starts as Anderlecht relinquished the title.

Hasi moved to Lokeren during the 2005–06 season. On 11 June 2007, he signed a two-year contract with Cercle Brugge.

International career

Albania
On 15 November 2000, Hasi made his debut with Albania in a friendly match against Malta after coming on as a substitute at 46th minute in place of Devi Muka, and he was one of the first Kosovo Albanian to play for Albania. Hasi received the Albanian citizenship on 21 February 2001.

Kosovo
Six months after retiring from international football with Albania, on 15 June 2007, Hasi made his debut with Kosovo in a friendly match against Saudi Arabia after being named in the starting line-up and acting as captain of the team.

Managerial career

Anderlecht
Hasi retired at the end of the 2007–08 season and became the assistant manager of his former club RSC Anderlecht. He signed a two-year contract at the club in 2008. On 10 March 2014, Hasi replaced John van den Brom as head coach. Following two and a half seasons with the club, Hasi was sacked on 26 May 2016 after losing the league title to rivals Club Brugge.

Legia Warsaw
On 4 June 2016, Hasi was appointed as the new manager of Legia Warsaw. Due to poor results, notably the disastrous 6–0 home defeat to Borussia Dortmund in the 2016–17 UEFA Champions League, Hasi was relieved of his duties on 18 September 2016.

Olympiacos
On 9 June 2017, Hasi was unveiled as the new manager of the Greek team Olympiacos F.C., penning a two-year contract worth €600k per annum. The board chose him over other candidates based on his experience in UEFA Champions League qualifying matches, with the objective of leading the Reds to the competition's group stage after a year's absence. The feat was officially accomplished on 22 August 2017, as the team pulled off a 3–1 aggregate victory (2–1 at home and 1–0 away) over Rijeka in the competition's playoffs. Criticized for his substandard defensive coaching and man management, Hasi was relieved of his duties on 25 September 2017, due to a string of negative results including a 2–3 Champions League group stage home defeat against Sporting CP, and successive league fixtures without a win, culminating to a 3–2 away loss to arch-rivals AEK despite being 0–2 up after just over 60 minutes of play.

Saudi Arabia
On 26 July 2018, Hasi was appointed as the manager of the Saudi Arabian club Al-Raed. During the 2019–20 season, Hasi lead Al-Raed to a fifth-place finish, their highest in the top flight. 

On 6 June 2021, Hasi was appointed as the manager of Al-Ahli. He was sacked on 4 March 2022 after a 1–0 defeat to Al-Ettifaq.

Career statistics

Club

International

Scores and results list Albania's goal tally first, score column indicates score after each Hasi goal.

Managerial statistics

Honours

Player
Genk
Belgian Pro League (1): 1998–99
Belgian Cup (1): 1999–2000

Anderlecht
Belgian Pro League (3): 2000–01, 2003–04, 2005–06 
Belgian Super Cup (1): 2000, 2001

Manager
Anderlecht
Belgian Pro League (1): 2013–14
Belgian Super Cup (1): 2014

Individual
Saudi Professional League Manager of the Month: November & December 2019

References

External links
Besnik Hasi at the official Cercle Brugge site 

Besnik Hasi at the FSHF

1971 births
Living people
Sportspeople from Gjakova
Kosovo Albanians
Albanian men's footballers
Albania international footballers
Kosovan men's footballers
Kosovo pre-2014 international footballers
Dual internationalists (football)
Association football midfielders
KF Liria players
NK Zagreb players
FK Dinamo Pančevo players
FC Prishtina players
NK Samobor players
K.R.C. Genk players
TSV 1860 Munich players
R.S.C. Anderlecht players
K.S.C. Lokeren Oost-Vlaanderen players
Cercle Brugge K.S.V. players
Bundesliga players
Belgian Pro League players
Challenger Pro League players
Albanian expatriate footballers
Kosovan expatriate footballers
Expatriate footballers in Croatia
Expatriate footballers in Belgium
Expatriate footballers in Germany
Kosovan expatriate sportspeople in Croatia
Albanian expatriate sportspeople in Croatia
Kosovan expatriate sportspeople in Belgium
Albanian expatriate sportspeople in Belgium
Kosovan expatriate sportspeople in Germany
Albanian expatriate sportspeople in Germany
Albanian football managers
Kosovan football managers
R.S.C. Anderlecht managers
Legia Warsaw managers
Olympiacos F.C. managers
Al-Raed FC managers
Al-Ahli Saudi FC managers
Expatriate football managers in Belgium
Expatriate football managers in Poland
Expatriate football managers in Greece
Expatriate football managers in Saudi Arabia
Kosovan expatriate sportspeople in Poland
Albanian expatriate sportspeople in Poland
Kosovan expatriate sportspeople in Greece
Albanian expatriate sportspeople in Greece
Kosovan expatriates in Saudi Arabia
Albanian expatriate sportspeople in Saudi Arabia
Saudi Professional League managers
Albanian expatriate football managers
Kosovan expatriate football managers